Heterocheirodon is a genus of characins from South America, with two described species:
 Heterocheirodon jacuiensis L. R. Malabarba & Bertaco, 1999
 Heterocheirodon yatai (Casciotta, Miquelarena & Protogino, 1992)

References
 

Characidae
Fish of South America